Caroline van Hook Bean (November 16, 1879 – December 24, 1980) was an American painter.

Born in Washington, D.C., Bean was the daughter of Tarleton Hoffman Bean, an ichthyologist at the Smithsonian Institution. In the 1890s she moved to New York City, where her father had become director of the New York Aquarium. From around 1893 to 1894 she studied in Paris, and she graduated from Smith College in 1903. She went on to study painting with Bernard Blommers and John Singer Sargent, and had lessons with Harry Thompson while in Paris. Bean lived in New York City from 1905 to 1921, during which time she studied under William Merritt Chase at the National Academy of Design. She then returned to Washington, where she kept a studio in Georgetown, in which neighborhood she also remodeled and built houses. 

During her career she was a member of the Society of Washington Artists, the Society of Washington Etchers, and the Washington Art Club. Bean was married to the engineer Algernon H. Binyon until his death; from 1913 to 1918 she had been married to Bart, the son of her teacher Bernard Blommers. She died at Georgetown University Hospital of a stroke, leaving no survivors. Known for her flower paintings and street scenes, especially of Washington, Bean was extensively active as a portraitist as well.

Bean was profiled in The New Yorker in 1970 on the occasion of an exhibit of some of her World War I-related work. She is the subject of a biography, Caroline van Hook Bean – The Last of the Impressionists.

References

1879 births
1980 deaths
American women painters
20th-century American painters
20th-century American women artists
Students of William Merritt Chase
Smith College alumni
National Academy of Design alumni
American portrait painters
Painters from Washington, D.C.
American centenarians
Women centenarians